The 1973–74 British Home Championship Home Nations football tournament was, like the two championships which preceded it, subject to rescheduled matches due to The Troubles in Northern Ireland. Scotland, who should have visited Belfast to play their match against Northern Ireland, instead hosted the game in Glasgow as the previous years solution of matches being played in Liverpool was not taken up. Bereft of home advantage, the Irish struggled to contain their opponents, although they did begin well with a narrow win over the Scots. In their first matches, England enjoyed their home advantage to claim victories over the Welsh and Irish while the Welsh crashed to defeat against England and Scotland. With the confusing schedule, by the final match England seemed to be favourites, only needing a draw with the Scots in Glasgow to claim the championship while a loss would still tie the series (goal difference was not at this stage used to calculate position). The Northern Irish, who could still have sneaked the championship themselves, lost a close game to the Welsh, leaving England and Scotland to battle for the final placements, the Scots reaching parity in the competition thanks to a 2–0 victory.

Table

Results

References

External links
1973–74 British Home Championship Details

1974
1974 in British sport
1973–74 in Northern Ireland association football
1973–74 in Welsh football
1973–74 in English football
1973–74 in Scottish football